Prince Pavel Nikolayevich Yengalychev (25 March 1864 – 12 August 1944, Lausanne) was a Russian prince and general.

He was a member of the noble Engalychev family. From 1894 until 1901 he was the Russian military attaché in Imperial Germany. He was then an observer at the German expeditionary corps during the Boxer Rebellion in Imperial China. He was the last commander of the Warsaw Military District and the last Governor-general of Warsaw before the Russians were forced to retreat from Privislinsky Krai during the First World War. During the Russian Civil War he supported the White movement, and emigrated after the Red Army victory.

His wife was Marguerite Alexeevna Stenbock-Fermor (1870 – 1942?, Lausanne).

1864 births
1944 deaths
Russian generals
Russian princes
Governors-General of Warsaw
Russian exiles
Russian military personnel of the Boxer Rebellion